The Le Maire Strait, also known as the Straits Lemaire, is a strait between Isla de los Estados ("Staten Island") and the eastern extremity of the Argentine portion of Tierra del Fuego.

History 
Jacob Le Maire and Willem Schouten discovered the strait in 1616, while attempting to find a navigation link between the Atlantic and Pacific Oceans, shortly before their discovery of Cape Horn. The strait was named in honor of Le Maire. The Le Maire Strait has been Argentine controlled, but has been a historical access route for Chilean vessels, under international maritime law. The stormy weather and strong currents that the waters around Cape Horn are so famous for also affect the strait. To avoid the risk of being blown against the shore of Tierra del Fuego, sailing ships often instead favour going around to the east of Isla de los Estados.

The Magellanic penguin is found in the Le Maire Strait; this penguin has a breeding colony on Isla de los Estados, the location of one of the more southerly Atlantic breeding colonies of the Magellanic penguin.

See also
 Garcia de Nodal expedition

References

Citations

Bibliography
 C. Michael Hogan. 2008. Magellanic Penguin, GlobalTwitcher.com, ed. N. Stromberg
 Michael A. Morris. 1989. The Strait of Magellan, page 90 of 237 pages

External links
  Satellite image from Google Maps

Landforms of Tierra del Fuego Province, Argentina
Straits of Argentina
1616 in the Dutch Empire
Maritime history of the Dutch Republic